Al-Zulfi FC is a Saudi Arabian football club based in Al Zulfi and competes in the Saudi Second Division, the third tier of Saudi football. The club was formerly known as Markh Club before changing to their current name in 2006 and its first president was Abdullah Mohammed Al-Humaidi.

Current squad 
As of Saudi Second Division:

References

Football clubs in Saudi Arabia
Football clubs in Al Zulfi
1969 establishments in Saudi Arabia
Association football clubs established in 1969